Jonathan Henrique Silva (born 21 July 1991 in Varginha, Minas Gerais) is a Brazilian triple jumper.

Career
He competed in the triple jump event at the 2012 Summer Olympics.

Personal bests
200 m: 21.35 (wind: +0.8 m/s) –  São Paulo, 22 August 2010
400 m: 46.78 –  São Paulo, 8 October 2011
110 m hurdles: 14.32 (wind: +1.9 m/s) –  Asunción, 17 April 2010
Long jump: 7.77 m (wind: +0.8 m/s) –  Santiago, 3 April 2013
Triple jump: 17.39 m –  São Paulo, 31 March 2012

Achievements

References

External links
 
 

Brazilian male triple jumpers
1991 births
Living people
Olympic athletes of Brazil
Athletes (track and field) at the 2012 Summer Olympics
South American Games gold medalists for Brazil
South American Games bronze medalists for Brazil
South American Games medalists in athletics
Competitors at the 2010 South American Games
Competitors at the 2014 South American Games
Competitors at the 2015 Summer Universiade
Sportspeople from Minas Gerais